Carlo Alberto Galluzzi (1919–2000) was an Italian politician. From 1976 till 1989, he served as a Member of the European Parliament. He was a member of the Communist Party of Italy. In 1983/1984 he served as Chair of the Delegation to the European Parliament/Spanish Cortes Joint Committee. From 1985 until 1987 he served as Chair of the Delegation for relations with Japan. During 1989 he served as Vice-Chair of the Delegation for relations with the Member States of ASEAN and the ASEAN Interparliamentary Organisation (AIPO) and the Republic of Korea.

References

1919 births
2000 deaths
MEPs for Italy 1979–1984
MEPs for Italy 1984–1989
Politicians from Florence
Italian Communist Party MEPs